Rasmus Bengtsson (born May 14, 1993) is a Swedish professional ice hockey player. He is currently playing for HV71 of the Swedish Hockey League (SHL). He was drafted in the second round of the 2011 NHL Entry Draft by the Florida Panthers with the 59th overall selection.

Playing career
Bengtsson was named to the 2008–09 Rikspucken All-Star Team. Rikspucken (which translates from Swedish as “National puck”) was a one-time tournament which occurred in 2009 for junior players who became too old for TV-pucken when the Swedish Ice Hockey Association lowered the maximum age from 16 to 15.

He had his breakthrough season playing for Rögle J20 during the 2009–10 season, and signed on for Rögle's senior team in June 2010.

Following Djurgårdens IF demotion to the HockeyAllsvenskan in the 2021–22 season, Bengtsson left the club and joined newly promoted HV71 on a three-year contract on 13 May 2022.

Bengtsson made 12 scoreless appearances with HV71 to begin the 2022–23 season before he was loaned for the remainder of the season to fellow SHL club, IK Oskarshamn, on 26 November 2022.

Career statistics

Regular season and playoffs

International

Awards and honours
2008–09 Rikspucken All-Star Team
2010 World U-17 Hockey Challenge (Bronze Medal with Team Sweden)
2011 IIHF World U18 Championships (Silver Medal with Team Sweden)

References

External links

1993 births
Living people
BIK Karlskoga players
IF Björklöven players
Djurgårdens IF Hockey players
Florida Panthers draft picks
HV71 players
Muskegon Lumberjacks players
IK Oskarshamn players
Rögle BK players
Swedish ice hockey defencemen
Tingsryds AIF players
VIK Västerås HK players
People from Landskrona Municipality
Sportspeople from Skåne County